Proctoporus xestus, or the river teiid, is a species of lizard in the family Gymnophthalmidae. The species is endemic to South America.

Geographic range
P. xestus occurs from central Peru to Bolivia (Chuquisaca, Cochabamba, and Santa Cruz departments) and northern Argentina (Jujuy, and Salta provinces).

Habitat

Description
The tail length is almost twice the SVL.

Reproduction
P. xestus is oviparous.

Taxonomy
P. xestus is the type species of the genus Opipeuter Uzzell, 1969, now synonymized with Proctoporus.

References

Further reading
Dirksen L, De la Riva I (1999). "The lizards and amphisbaenians of Bolivia (Reptilia, Squamata): checklist, localities, and bibliography". Graellsia 55: 199–215. (Opipeuter xestus).
Goicoechea, Padial JM, Chaparro JC, Castroviejo-Fisher S, De la Riva I (2012). "Molecular phylogenetics, species diversity, and biogeography of the Andean lizards of the genus Proctoporus (Squamata: Gymnophthalmidae)". Molecular Phylogenetics and Evolution 65 (3): 953–964. (Proctoporus xestus, new combination).
Köhler G, Veselý M (2007). "The hemipenis of Opipeuter xestus (Squamata: Gymnophthalmidae)". Salamandra 43 (1): 49–51.
Lehr E (2003). Amphibien und Reptilien in Peru. Münster: Natur und Tier Verlag. 208 pp. . (in German).
Uzzell T (1969). "A New Genus and Species of Teiid Lizard from Bolivia". Postilla (129): 1–15. (Opipeuter xestus, new species).

Proctoporus
Lizards of South America
Reptiles of Argentina
Reptiles of Bolivia
Reptiles of Peru
Reptiles described in 1969
Taxa named by Thomas Marshall Uzzell, Jr.